The British Universities Ice Hockey Association was founded in spring term 2003 by a group of hockey players from the universities of Oxford, London, Nottingham and Newcastle.

History of the BUIHA 
The British Universities Ice Hockey Association, or BUIHA, was formed in response to the growing number of universities with ice hockey programmes in an effort to provide students with competitive ice hockey whilst at university, no matter what their level of play.

The notion to form the BUIHA first arose in Easter 2003. The idea was to simply form a divisional competition for the existing university teams. Development over the summer of 2003 led to a committee being put in place, a schedule being set and a number of teams signed up to take part in the first ever BUIHA University Cup. The National Championships was already an existing competition. Indeed, the 2003/04 formative season finished in style at the National Championships weekend where the then 13 member teams battled it out for The Rawlinson Plate & The Hopkins Plate.

The following season, to further the BUIHA objective of progression at all levels of the sport, the BUIHA introduced Division 3. Also joining the BUIHA in its second season were a number of new university teams, a number that would be again bolstered in its 3rd season, bringing the total teams for 2005-6 to 29.

The 2008/09 Season saw the Bristol Lions enter for the 1st time.  The sole new entrant in the 2009/10 season were the newly formed Kent Knights, who arrived on the scene with an old friend lining up in a Knights roster.  It was the time that Old Skool had ended his association with Imperial College Devils and was playing for his University for the very first time.  The 2010/11 season saw the Oxford Women's Blues join their Cambridge counterparts in Division 3 South, and in 2012 we saw a team from St Andrews enter the National Championships in Tier II.

In the 2012/13 there was a change in cup competition structure, with Division 3 becoming Non-checking Division 1, and the addition of a third checking division. New teams joined the competition from UCL and University of East Anglia, and a reformed Northumbria team joined as the Kings. Unfortunately, the season started without the return of teams from Bristol and Huddersfield.

2013/14 Season saw the Birmingham Eagles finally gain recognition for their Students Guild, part of the deal saw the club rebranded as the Birmingham Lions to fall inline with the other sports clubs at the university.

The National Championships 
The then secretary of the Oxford Vikings, Alexis Rawlinson, came up with the idea of organising a tournament for all the university ice hockey teams in the UK. At the time this was not such a daunting organisational prospect, given that there were only seven teams.

A few weeks later five teams (blues squads were not invited as they were above the standard of all other teams) gathered for a late night ice hockey session at Oxford Ice Rink starting at 11 pm and running all the way through to the morning. The result of this was a narrow Newcastle victory by one point over the Oxford Vikings. Newcastle arranged the next two events at the National Ice Centre (NIC) in Nottingham, which saw victories for Newcastle in 2002 and London in 2003.

For 2004, to recognise the contribution of Alexis to British University Ice Hockey, the top National Championship trophy was renamed the Rawlinson Plate.

2004 also saw the introduction of a 2nd Tier of competition due to the introduction of many new teams. The BUIHA is now host of a range of new teams from England, Scotland and Wales as well as the original seven that entered the first National Championships in 2001. From 2005 onwards tier II was renamed The Hopkins Plate.  From the start of the 2015 season onwards the Tier 3 national championship trophy is to be renamed the Miller Trophy to honour the ongoing work the chairman, Andrew Miller, puts into the job.

The Cup competition 
Created in Autumn 2003 by the founding BUIHA committee the cup competition was envisioned as a league type competition available to university clubs in the UK.

Operating within the EIHA recreational section the clubs involved played a round robin format with the winner being declared at the end of the season as the team with the most points (using goal difference as a tie breaker).

Founding clubs of the initial two divisions (in alphabetical order) were:

Division 1
 Cambridge University Blues
 University of London Union Purples
 Nottingham Universities Mavericks A

Division 2

 Birmingham Eagles
 Cambridge University Eskimos
 Imperial College Devils
 Newcastle University Wildcats
 Nottingham Universities Mavericks  B
 Oxford University Vikings
 University of Warwick Panthers

From the 2008/2009 season the BUIHA operated directly under the EIHA board after being awarded a section of their own and separating from the Rec section.  This has led to several improvements to the way the organisation can operate.

Team Great Britain 
Launched at the end of the 2004–5 season, Team Great Britain is the national university side that will compete against other national university sides, including competing at the bi-annual FISU World University Games. Mike Urquhart & Matt Bradbury have agreed to coach the team. Any person attending university anywhere in the world who is a UK & Northern Ireland citizen between the ages of 17 and 28 is able to play for the team. This disregards the level to which they have played the sport.

Winners

Checking Division 1

Checking Division 2

Checking Division 3

Non-Checking Division 1 (formerly Division 3)

Non-checking Division 2

Non-checking Division 3

Non-Checking Division 4

Women's

Member teams

External links 
 British University Ice Hockey Association official web site

References 

University ice hockey in the United Kingdom
Sports organizations established in 2003
University of Nottingham
Organisations based in Nottinghamshire
2003 establishments in the United Kingdom
Ice hockey governing bodies in the United Kingdom